Claudia Wright (17 June 1934 – 29 January 2005) was an Australian journalist, noted for highlighting the cause of feminism, and being one of the first journalists to interview middle East leaders in the 1970s.

Early years and working in Bendigo 
Claudia Wright was born in Bendigo, June 17, 1934.  Of poor, multicultural stock (her grandmother was Chinese), she attended school in Bendigo and worked her way up as a journalist, her first foothold being a job with the local Bendigo paper. She met her husband, Michael in Bendigo.

Early career 
After leaving Bendigo, Wright joined the Melbourne Herald, working on the paper's social and fashion columns. She eventually was promoted to the position of editor of the Women's Section. Wright used the position to critique some of the hypocrisies and corruption of some the social set, especially the vice-regal pretensions of the Government House social scene. It gave her the opportunity to get to know the members at the Melbourne Cup, and despite her published critiques, she became good friends with many of them, even where there were political differences. She was moved out of the position by Rupert Murdoch, and became a lifelong critic of him.

Work at 3AW and the 1970s 
She moved to Melbourne in the 1950s initially becoming a columnist for The Australian Women's Weekly.

After leaving The Herald, Wright moved on to a popular morning slot with long running hosts Ormsby Wilkins and Norman Banks. During this time, Wright became a high profile feminist, with support from the majority of the feminist community, and became a lifelong friend of Germaine Greer. She also took on the Catholic Church, discussing their issues. She also travelled the Middle East. She was one of the first western journalists to meet some of the famous leaders of the era,  including Libya's Muammar Gaddafi, Yasser Arafat of the PLO, and leaders of Saudi Arabia, Kuwait, and Oman. She reported sympathetically on the plight of the Palestinians. She conducted interviews with famous Israeli figures at the time, including General Moshe Dayan.

She left 3AW in 1977. Her position was difficult there because of her involvement in Israeli-Arab politics, protests against her from various ethnic groups and her statements about Catholic doctrine had caused issue with the church doctrine. This had caused some alarm by advertisers. A change in management saw her position being challenged, and she resigned.

She was at the peak of her fame at this time, being one of the two most well known broadcasters in Australia, along with John Laws.

Move to the United states 
She moved to the United States, basing herself in Washington, D.C. Here she worked on National Public Radio, and was a correspondent for New Statesman, for the French Catholic weekly, Temoignage Chretien, and for the leading Greek newspaper, Ta Nea. Her work was published widely in popular U.S. newspapers, including the New York Times, the Los Angeles Times, and Washington Post, as well as in the leading foreign policy journals of the U.S., including Foreign Affairs. While in the states she separated from her first husband, and married her second husband, John Helmer, a Russian scholar. There they had a son named Tully.

Health decline and death 
Wright got dementia in her later years and was public about its effects. Suffering from its effects, she left her work in the U.S. and returned home to Australia, moving into her Toorak home in 1989. She lived there for six years before being admitted to a nursing home in the Melbourne suburb of Kew. She died in 2005.

Awards 
Wright was honoured with the award of a Woodrow Wilson Fellowship at the United States Smithsonian Institution.

References

External links 
 Member of discussion panel, broadcast in 1986

1934 births
2005 deaths
People from Bendigo
Journalists from Victoria (Australia)
Australian women journalists
Australian women radio presenters
3AW presenters